Two total lunar eclipses occurred in 1971: 

 10 February 1971 lunar eclipse
 6 August 1971 lunar eclipse

See also 
 List of 20th-century lunar eclipses
 Lists of lunar eclipses